Chongqing, formerly romanized as Chungking, is a municipality of China.

Chongqing, Chungking, or Chung King may also refer to:

 Chongqing (崇慶; 1212–1213), era name used by Wanyan Yongji, Jin dynasty emperor
 Chongqing Subdistrict, a subdistrict of Chaoyang District, Changchun, Jilin, China
 Chongqing dog, an old and rare breed of dog from China
 Chongzhou, formerly Chongqing County, in Chengdu, Sichuan, China
 Chungking (band), British indie pop group 
 Chung King Studios, New York City recording studio
 Chungking Mansions, building in Kowloon, Hong Kong
 Chung King Road, pedestrian street in Los Angeles
 Chungking bristle, alternative name for hog bristle artist's brushes
 HMS Aurora (12), a British cruiser renamed to Chonq Qing while under Chinese service
 Empress Xiaoshengxian was known as Empress Dowager Chongqing during the reign of her son, the Qianlong Emperor

See also
 Chunking (disambiguation), an unrelated english word which is a common misspelling of this name
 Chungkingosaurus, dinosaur species first discovered in China
 Chun King, line of US marketed Chinese food products
 Chung Ching Wei (1914–1987) Chinese-born American businessman who created the Precision Club bidding system in contract bridge